Paimal Sharif is a town, that is one of twenty union councils in Battagram District in the Khyber Pakhtunkhwa Province of Pakistan.

It has educational buildings, health facilities, Govt higher secondary school paimal, govt primary schools and a BASIC health unit paimal.

References

Union councils of Battagram District
Populated places in Battagram District